The 2021 AFL Women's best and fairest award was presented to the players adjudged the best and fairest players during the 2021 AFL Women's season. Kiara Bowers of the Fremantle Football Club and Brianna Davey of the Collingwood Football Club jointly won the award with 15 votes each.

Leading votegetters

Voting procedure
The three field umpires (the umpires who control the flow of the game, as opposed to goal or boundary umpires) confer after each match and award three votes, two votes and one vote to the players they regard as the best, second-best and third-best in the match, respectively. The votes are kept secret until the awards night, and are read and tallied on the evening.

References

2021 AFL Women's season
AFL Women's awards